The Kg m/40 was an automatic rifle used by the Swedish Army during the 1940s. A small number were also manufactured in Germany by Knorr-Bremse for the Wehrmacht and Waffen-SS, under the name MG35/36A, though they were mostly nicknamed "the Knorr-Bremse".  The German models were chambered for the higher pressure 7.92×57mm Mauser and weighed 10 kg.

The Swedish Kg m/1940 loaded its magazine from the side, similar to the FG 42. It also had the ability to use 20 round magazines from Swedish type M1918 BARs. In 1940 there was a desperate need for machine guns in Sweden. The production rate of Kg m/37 (Swedish BAR variant) was rather slow and not suitable for modern production.

In 1940, a LMG was accepted called system SAV (Svenska Automat Vapen = Swedish Automatic Weapons). The design was made by a German called Hans Lauf at Magdeburg Maschinenfabrik AG. However the patent starts out from 22 November 1933 in Sweden. He had two fellow applicants from Sweden: Ivar Staeck and Torsten Lindfors.

Staeck and Lindfors got the patent for the double gas canal system and the double trigger construction. This prototype was called LH33 and it later became Kg m/40. 1935 Hans Lauf became manager for the AG Knorr-Bremse, Berlin-Lichtenberg. There he got a patent on September 19, 1935 for a similar weapon called LH35 which is modified to LH36 and this prototype was later accepted as the German MG 35/36. Wendelin Przykalla at Knorr-Bremse AG made some further improvements 1939. The weapon was most likely only designed at Knorr-Bremse but manufactured in Waffenfabrik Steyr.

Users
 Used some small numbers during World War II

See also
Huot automatic rifle
Bren light machine gun
Lahti-Saloranta M/26
FG-42
FM-24/29
M1941 Johnson machine gun
MG 30
SVT-40

References

Light machine guns
Machine guns of Sweden
World War II machine guns
Military equipment introduced in the 1930s